Enrique Jesús "Kike" Salas Valiente (born 23 April 2002) is a Spanish professional footballer who plays as a central defender for Tenerife, on loan from Sevilla.

Club career
Born in Morón de la Frontera, Seville, Andalusia, Salas joined Sevilla FC's youth setup in 2013, aged 11. He made his senior debut with the reserves on 10 January 2021, coming on as a half-time substitute for Juan María Alcedo in a 3–1 Segunda División B away loss against Yeclano Deportivo.

On 27 April 2021, while still a youth, Salas renewed his contract until 2024. He subsequently established himself as a regular for the B-side, and scored his first senior goal on 9 January 2022, in a 1–0 Primera División RFEF home win over Real Balompédica Linense.

Salas made his first team – and La Liga – debut on 10 September 2022, starting in a 3–2 away win over Espanyol. The following 31 January, he signed a contract extension with Sevilla through to 2026, and joined Segunda División club CD Tenerife on loan for the remainder of the season.

Career statistics

Club

Personal life
Salas' uncle Víctor was also a footballer. A midfielder, he too was groomed at Sevilla.

References

External links
 
 

2002 births
Living people
Sportspeople from the Province of Seville
Spanish footballers
Footballers from Andalusia
Association football defenders
La Liga players
Primera Federación players
Segunda División B players
Tercera Federación players
Sevilla FC C players
Sevilla Atlético players
Sevilla FC players
CD Tenerife players